Fangcheng may refer to:

Places in China

Fangcheng County (方城县), of Nanyang, Henan
Fangcheng District (防城区), Fangchenggang, Guangxi
Fangcheng, Fangchenggang (防城镇), town in and seat of Fangcheng District
Fangcheng, Linyi (方城镇), town in Lanshan District, Linyi, Shandong
Fangcheng, Xintai (放城镇), town in Shandong

Other

Fangcheng (mathematics), the eighth Chapter of the Chinese mathematical classic Jiuzhang suanshu (The Nine Chapters on the Mathematical Art)
Fangcheng Fellowship, a Christian religious movement in China